Sestra is a genus of moths in the family Geometridae. All species are endemic to New Zealand.

Species
Sestra flexata (Walker, 1862)
Sestra humeraria (Walker, 1861)

References
Natural History Museum Lepidoptera genus database
Fauna of New Zealand - Lithinini (Insecta: Lepidoptera: Geometridae: Ennominae)

Geometridae
Geometridae genera